The Broadway–Lafayette Street/Bleecker Street station is a New York City Subway station complex in the NoHo neighborhood of Manhattan on the IRT Lexington Avenue Line and the IND Sixth Avenue Line. It is served by the 6, D, and F trains at all times; the B and M trains on weekdays; the <6> and <F> trains during rush hours in the peak direction; and the 4 train during late nights.

The complex comprises two stations, Bleecker Street and Broadway–Lafayette Street. The Bleecker Street station was built for the Interborough Rapid Transit Company (IRT), and was a local station on the city's first subway line, which was approved in 1900. The station opened on October 27, 1904, as one of the original 28 stations of the New York City Subway. The Broadway–Lafayette Street station was built as an express station for the Independent Subway System (IND) and opened on January 1, 1936.

The Bleecker Street station has two side platforms and four tracks; express trains use the inner two tracks to bypass the station. The Broadway–Lafayette Street station has two island platforms and four tracks. The transfer between the downtown IRT platform and the IND platform has been within fare control since May 19, 1957, and the corresponding free transfer from the uptown IRT platform to the rest of the station opened on September 25, 2012. The station complex contains elevators, which make it compliant with the Americans with Disabilities Act of 1990. The original portion of the Bleecker Street station's interior is a New York City designated landmark and listed on the National Register of Historic Places.

History

IRT Lexington Avenue Line 
Planning for a subway line in New York City dates to 1864. However, development of what would become the city's first subway line did not start until 1894, when the New York State Legislature authorized the Rapid Transit Act. The subway plans were drawn up by a team of engineers led by William Barclay Parsons, chief engineer of the Rapid Transit Commission. It called for a subway line from New York City Hall in lower Manhattan to the Upper West Side, where two branches would lead north into the Bronx. A plan was formally adopted in 1897, and all legal conflicts concerning the route alignment were resolved near the end of 1899. The Rapid Transit Construction Company, organized by John B. McDonald and funded by August Belmont Jr., signed the initial Contract 1 with the Rapid Transit Commission in February 1900, in which it would construct the subway and maintain a 50-year operating lease from the opening of the line. In 1901, the firm of Heins & LaFarge was hired to design the underground stations. Belmont incorporated the Interborough Rapid Transit Company (IRT) in April 1902 to operate the subway.

The Bleecker Street station was constructed as part of the route segment from Chambers Street to Great Jones Street. Construction on this section of the line began on July 10, 1900, and was awarded to Degnon-McLean Contracting Company. In the vicinity of the Bleecker Street station, the subway was to run under Lafayette Street, a new thoroughfare constructed between 1897 and 1905. This involved widening, connecting, and renaming two formerly unconnected streets: Elm Street, which ran south of Houston Street, and Lafayette Place, which ran north of Great Jones Street to an intersection with Astor Place. The southward extension of Lafayette Street and the construction of the subway required the demolition or underpinning of several buildings in the street's path. This resulted in the creation of narrow land lots on either side of Lafayette Street between Houston and Great Jones Streets, an area that included the Bleecker Street station's site. During the station's construction, a portion of the ceiling collapsed in late 1903. By late 1903, the subway was nearly complete, but the IRT Powerhouse and the system's electrical substations were still under construction, delaying the system's opening.

The Bleecker Street station opened on October 27, 1904, as one of the original 28 stations of the New York City Subway from City Hall to 145th Street  on the Broadway–Seventh Avenue Line. The opening of the first subway line, and particularly the Bleecker Street station, helped contribute to more development in the East Village, which at the time was already densely populated. After the first subway line was completed in 1908, the station was served by local trains along both the West Side (now the Broadway–Seventh Avenue Line to Van Cortlandt Park–242nd Street) and East Side (now the Lenox Avenue Line). West Side local trains had their southern terminus at City Hall during rush hours and South Ferry at other times, and had their northern terminus at 242nd Street. East Side local trains ran from City Hall to Lenox Avenue (145th Street).

To address overcrowding, in 1909, the New York Public Service Commission proposed lengthening platforms at stations along the original IRT subway. As part of a modification to the IRT's construction contracts, made on January 18, 1910, the company was to lengthen station platforms to accommodate ten-car express and six-car local trains. In addition to $1.5 million (equivalent to $ million in ) spent on platform lengthening, $500,000 was spent on building additional entrances and exits. It was anticipated that these improvements would increase capacity by 25 percent. Six-car local trains began operating in October 1910. The Lexington Avenue Line opened north of Grand Central–42nd Street in 1918, thereby dividing the original line into an "H"-shaped system. All local trains were sent via the Lexington Avenue Line, running along the Pelham Line in the Bronx. 

In December 1922, the Transit Commission approved a $3 million project to lengthen platforms at 14 local stations along the original IRT line, including Bleecker Street and seven other stations on the Lexington Avenue Line. The commission postponed the platform-lengthening project in September 1923, at which point the cost had risen to $5.6 million.

IND Sixth Avenue Line 
The IND Sixth Avenue Line was designed to replace the elevated IRT Sixth Avenue Line. The first portion of the line to be constructed was then known as the Houston–Essex Street Line, which ran under Houston, Essex, and Rutgers Streets. The contract for the line was awarded to Corson Construction in January 1929, and construction of this section officially started in May 1929.

The Broadway–Lafayette Street station opened on January 1, 1936, as one of four stations on the first part of the Sixth Avenue Line. Two local tracks split from a junction with the Eighth Avenue Line south of West Fourth Street–Washington Square, running east under Houston Street and south under Essex Street to a temporary terminal at East Broadway. The station was initially served by E trains to Church Avenue. When further sections of the Sixth Avenue Line opened on December 15, 1940, the F train replaced the E train at the Broadway–Lafayette Street station.

Modifications and transfers

1940s to 1970s 
The city government took over the IRT's operations on June 12, 1940.  A free transfer passageway from the downtown IRT platform to the IND platform opened on May 19, 1957, after the IRT station's platforms were lengthened by two cars to accommodate 10-car trains. This "one-way" transfer was purely coincidental and was not intended in the original construction. The construction of a connection from the northbound platform would have required more extensive construction, including knocking down support walls and digging a tunnel. The northbound platform was extended two car lengths to the north because it was easier to do and cost less. As a result, a free transfer was not available to the northbound platform and access to it required a one-block walk north to Bleecker Street and payment of an additional fare. 

In April 1960, work began on a $3,509,000 project (equivalent to $ million in ) to lengthen platforms at seven IRT Lexington Avenue Line stations to accommodate ten-car trains.

On November 26, 1967, the first part of the Chrystie Street Connection opened, connecting the IND station's express tracks at the Broadway–Lafayette Street station to the Manhattan Bridge. The express tracks started to be used by the B and D trains. On July 1, 1968, the portion of the Chrystie Street Connection connecting the IND station's local tracks with the Williamsburg Bridge opened. The Williamsburg Bridge connection has been used by the M train since 2010.

1980s to present 

A transfer between the IND platforms and the uptown IRT platform had been planned since 1989, when the project was included in the Metropolitan Transportation Authority (MTA)'s third capital program. Construction on the transfer would have started in 1992 pending the approval of the program by the State Legislature. The MTA estimated that 15,000 daily passengers would use the free transfer. Most passengers transferring between the IND and the uptown IRT platform continued to pay an additional fare, except for holders of unlimited-ride MetroCards, after that option was introduced in the 1990s.

Further progress on the IND/IRT transfer stalled until 2005, when the MTA allocated $50 million to renovate the complex in its 2005–2009 capital program. The project included $9.2 million for the IRT platforms' renovation, $8.9 million for ADA-accessible elevators, and $31.9 million for a free transfer to the uptown IRT platform. On March 26, 2012, the uptown platform was shifted south to the newly constructed extension, and the 1950s northern extension closed at the same time. At the time, the MTA stated that the transfer project to the uptown Bleecker Street platform would be completed at the end of June.

The uptown transfer did not fully open until September 25, 2012. The overall cost of the rehabilitation project had climbed to $135 million. On the same day, an escalator connected the uptown platform of the Broadway-Lafayette Street station with a new transfer mezzanine that connected riders to the uptown platform of the Bleecker Street station. In addition, elevators were installed to connect the various platforms of the IND station, and those of Bleecker Street. The transfer contained new elevators and escalators to the IND station below. The street-level elevator accesses the southbound IRT platform directly, while four other elevators in the station connect each IND platform with each IRT platform.

Station layout 

A passageway connects the downtown IRT platform under Lafayette Street and the mezzanine at Broadway. There is a lower level mezzanine for the IND underneath the IRT platforms.

Exits

The station has a total of 12 staircase entrances and 1 elevator entrance. They are clustered in three locations: the intersection of Broadway and Houston Street, the intersection of Lafayette and Houston Streets, and the intersection of Lafayette and Bleecker Streets, The exits at Houston Street primarily serve the IND platforms while the exits at Lafayette Street primarily serve the IRT platforms. The northbound IRT platform's exits are on the eastern side of Lafayette Street while the southbound platform's exits are on the western side.

There are two stairs at Broadway and Houston Street, one at either eastern corner. The southeastern one is built inside an alcove of an Adidas Sport Performance Center. It leads to the full-time entrance to the IND station, above the center of that station, which contains a turnstile bank and token booth. There are closed staircases from the extreme western ends of both platforms that lead to a western mezzanine with exits to the west side of Broadway and Houston Street. It is currently used by employees.

The upper IND mezzanine has two fare control areas that are shared with the southbound IRT platform. A set of turnstiles on the south side leads to two staircases at the southeast corner of Lafayette and Houston Streets. Another set of turnstiles on the north side leads to a stair and an elevator on the northwest corner of Lafayette and Houston Streets. The extreme east end of the IND station contains stairs and escalators to the eastern mezzanine, which is shared with the northbound IRT platform. This mezzanine contains two stairs, one to each eastern corner of Houston and Lafayette Streets.

There are five stairs near Lafayette and Bleecker Streets. One stair each goes to the northwestern and southwestern corners of Lafayette and Bleecker Streets, and serve the southbound IRT platform. One stair each goes to the northeastern, southwestern, and southeastern corners of Mulberry and Bleecker Streets, and serve the northbound IRT platform.

IRT Lexington Avenue Line platforms

The Bleecker Street station is a local station on the IRT Lexington Avenue Line with four tracks and two side platforms. The 6 stops here at all times, rush-hour and midday <6> trains stop here in the peak direction; and the 4 stops here during late nights. The two express tracks are used by the 4 and 5 trains during daytime hours. The platform extensions were originally at the front ends of the original platforms: the southbound platform was extended southward and the northbound platform was extended northward. After the 2012 renovation, the northbound platform was extended to the south, and the northern extension of that platform was closed.

In 1979, the New York City Landmarks Preservation Commission designated the space within the boundaries of the original station, excluding expansions made after 1904, as a city landmark. The station was designated along with eleven others on the original IRT. The original interiors were listed on the National Register of Historic Places in 2004.

Design
As with other stations built as part of the original IRT, the station was constructed using a cut-and-cover method. The tunnel is covered by a "U"-shaped trough that contains utility pipes and wires. Each platform consists of  concrete slabs, beneath which are drainage basins. The original platforms contain circular, cast-iron Tuscan-style columns spaced every , while the platform extensions contain I-beam columns. Additional columns between the tracks, spaced every , support the jack-arched concrete station roofs. There is a  gap between the trough wall and the platform walls, which are made of -thick brick covered over by a tiled finish.

The fare control areas are at platform level. The crossunder between the platforms is via the IND station. The walls along the platforms near the fare control areas consist of a brick wainscoting on the lowest part of the wall, with bronze air vents along the wainscoting, and white glass tiles above. Bands of blue mosaic tiles run above the wainscoting. A cornice with foliate motifs runs above each wall. Faience plaques containing the letter "B" are placed at  intervals. On the walls are placed large oval tablets with the white letters "Bleecker Street" on a blue frame. There were originally four such tablets on each platform, or eight total. The mosaic tiles at all original IRT stations were manufactured by the American Encaustic Tile Company, which subcontracted the installations at each station. The decorative work was performed by faience contractor Grueby Faience Company.

The ceilings of the original platforms and fare control areas contain plaster molding. The northbound platform contains doorways that formerly led to men's and women's restrooms, with corresponding marble lintels.

The northern platform extension of the northbound platform, now walled off, had green tiles and a darker green trim line with "BLEECKER ST" written on it in black sans serif font at regular intervals. These tiles were installed during the late 1950s renovation. The platform extension of the southbound platform had similar tiles, which were removed in the 2012 extension.

Gallery

IND Sixth Avenue Line platforms

The Broadway–Lafayette Street station on the IND Sixth Avenue Line is an express station, located on East Houston Street between Broadway and Lafayette Street in Manhattan. It has four tracks and two island platforms. The inner express tracks are served by the B during weekdays and the D at all times. The outer local tracks are served by the F at all times, the <F> during rush hours in the peak direction, and the M during weekdays.

The centers of both platforms have three staircases that go up to a mezzanine, where wide staircases on either side go up to the station's three fare control areas.

Design
Both outer track walls have been renovated with a blue trim line on a black border and small "BROADWAY" tile captions beneath in white lettering on a black background, most mimicking the original IND tile captions but with some in arial font. Blue I-beam columns run along either side of both platforms at regular intervals with alternating ones having the standard black station name plate and white lettering.

Track layout 
West (railroad north) of this station, there are crossovers between the two northbound tracks and a single one between the express tracks. The line turns north along Sixth Avenue and goes through a complex set of switches and crossovers with the IND Eighth Avenue Line before arriving at West Fourth Street–Washington Square.

East (railroad south) of this station, there used to be a crossover between the two southbound tracks before they were reconfigured in 1967 by the Chrystie Street Connection. B and D trains turn south down Chrystie Street with a stop at Grand Street before crossing the Manhattan Bridge into Brooklyn. F trains continue directly east with a stop at Second Avenue, turn south on Essex Street with two more stops at Delancey Street and East Broadway, before passing under the East River through the Rutgers Street Tunnel into Brooklyn. M trains use a connection that leads to Essex Street on the BMT Nassau Street Line before crossing the Williamsburg Bridge into Brooklyn.

Art 

The 1998 artwork in the IND station is called Signal by Mel Chin. It features stainless steel and glass sculptures with lights on the mezzanine walls and ceramic tiles on the platform walls.

A new MTA's Arts for Transit project was created in 2012, called Hive, by Leo Villareal. It is located at the newest section of the uptown platform in the mezzanine providing the transfer to the IND station. The work consists of hexagonal lights that can change color.

References

External links 

 Forgotten NY – Original 28 - NYC's First 28 Subway Stations

nycsubway.org

 
 
 nycsubway.org – Signal Artwork by Mel Chin (1998) 

Station Reporter

 Station Reporter – 4 Train
 Station Reporter – 6 Train
 Station Reporter – B Train
 Station Reporter – D Train
 Station Reporter – F Train
 Station Reporter – M Train

MTA's Arts For Transit

Hive at Bleecker Street/Lafayette Street
Signal at Bleecker Street/Lafayette Street
Broadway–Lafayette Street/Bleecker Street

Google Maps Street View

 Bleecker Street entrance 
 Broadway entrance 
 Lafayette Street entrance 
 Mulberry Street entrance 
 IRT platforms and transfer 
 IND platforms 

IND Sixth Avenue Line stations
New York City Subway stations in Manhattan
Railway stations in the United States opened in 1936
New York City Subway transfer stations
IRT Lexington Avenue Line stations
Railway and subway stations on the National Register of Historic Places in Manhattan
Railway stations in the United States opened in 1904
1904 establishments in New York City
1936 establishments in New York City
West Village
SoHo, Manhattan
New York City Designated Landmarks in Manhattan
New York City interior landmarks